Bay Park is a Nassau County-owned park in Bay Park, in Nassau County, on Long Island, in New York, United States.

Description 
Bay Park entered Nassau County's park system in 1947.

Amenities at the park include a golf course, a playground, picnic areas, sports fields, a dog park, and fishing and boating facilities.

The golf course within Bay Park consists of 9 holes. A controversy took place in the late 1960s regarding this golf course. Many Nassau residents grew frustrated over fact that the golf course was closed; the closure resulted from cuts to Nassau's budget, as the funds needed to hire personnel were not available. Although the golf course was eventually opened that summer during daylight hours, other areas of the park would remain closed for the season due to the funding issues.

According to the United States Geological Survey, Bay Park is located 20 feet (6 m) above sea level.

See also 

 Cantiague Park – Another major park owned and operated by Nassau County.
 Christopher Morley Park – Another major park owned and operated by Nassau County.
 Eisenhower Park – Another major park owned and operated by Nassau County.
 North Woodmere Park – Another major park owned and operated by Nassau County.
 Wantagh Park – Another major park owned and operated by Nassau County.

References 

Parks in Nassau County, New York
Hempstead, New York